The Lord Nelson Victory Tug is a brand of recreational trawler designed by James Backus and produced by Lord Nelson Yachts, Inc. based in Seattle, Washington in the United States.

Delivery of the first 37-foot hull was in 1983. The tugs are no longer in production, the last one being delivered in 1997.

Models

Similar boats 
Other motor yachts built in the style of a tugboat include American Tugs manufactured by Tomco Marine Group, Inc., in La Conner, Washington, USA; Nordic Tugs built in Burlington, Washington, USA; Ranger Tugs made in Kent, Washington, USA; and the Sundowner Tug (no longer in production).

References

Further reading 
Sea Magazine, December 2006, Lord of the Tugs
The Kitsap Sun, August 26, 2006, Shawna Walls, Tugboats Steaming Around Kitsap
2007 Powerboat Guide, Ed McNew, "Lord Nelson 37 Victory Tug, 1984-89", p. 896
 Soundings Online Magazine "Ready and able . . .Tugs reflect the working-class heritage of their forebears."
Western Boatman magazine, October/November 1984 (cover photo), "Lord Nelson Victory 37 Tug"

External links 
Classic Yacht Magazine, Victory in Seattle, p. 26-31, Dec. 2006/Winter 2007  
Classic Yacht Magazine, Living Legends (Jim Backus), p. 32-34, Dec. 2006/Winter 2007  
Classic Yacht Magazine, Victory in The Pacific, p. 58-64, Spring 2007 
Lord Nelson Victory Tug Owners Association 
Westlawn Institute of Marine Technology

Motorboats